Tonga Island Marine Reserve is a protected area on the northern coast of the South Island of New Zealand. It surrounds Tonga Island and is next to the Abel Tasman National Park.

See also
Marine reserves of New Zealand

References

External links
Tonga Island Marine Reserve at the Department of Conservation
Tonga Island Marine Reserve fact sheet
 

Marine reserves of New Zealand
Protected areas established in 1993
Protected areas of the Tasman District
1993 establishments in New Zealand
Abel Tasman National Park
Tasman Bay